Marion Anthony Samuel (born November 14, 1955) is an American college football coach and former player. He served as head football coach at New Mexico State University (NMSU) from 1997 to 2004 and Southeast Missouri State University (SEMO) from 2005 to 2013, compiling a career college football record of 65 wins and 117 losses. Samuel had a 34–57 record at New Mexico State, which puts him third all-time for wins in program history.

Playing career
Samuel played four years at the University of Nebraska–Lincoln and was a member of Tom Osborne's first recruiting class. He was a two-year starter at defensive end, played in four bowl games and earned honorable mention All-Big Eight Conference honors as a senior.

Early coaching career
From 1986 to 1996, Samuel coached the outside linebackers and rush ends at Nebraska, his alma mater, for head coach Tom Osborne. He mentored six first-team All-Americans and 12 future National Football League players, including first-round draft picks Broderick Thomas (1989), Mike Croel (1991), Trev Alberts (1994) and Grant Wistrom (1998). During Samuel's 11 seasons with the Cornhuskers, they were national champions in 1994 and 1995, captured seven Big Eight or Big 12 Conference championships, averaged 10 wins per year and played in 11 bowl games.

Head coaching tenures
At New Mexico State from 1997 to 2004 as his contract was not renewed, Samuel compiled a 34–57 record. Their 6–5 record in 1999 was the best since 1992 and a 7–5 record in 2002 remains their best record since 1970 and through the 2016 season.

Personal life
A native of Trinidad, Trinidad and Tobago, West Indies, Samuel moved to Jersey City, New Jersey, at the age of 10. He earned his B.S. degree in education from Nebraska in 1981.

Head coaching record

References

External links
 UNLV profile
 Southeast Missouri State profile (2013)
 New Mexico State profile (2004)

1955 births
Living people
American football defensive ends
Georgia State Panthers football coaches
Nebraska Cornhuskers football coaches
Nebraska Cornhuskers football players
New Mexico State Aggies football coaches
Purdue Boilermakers football coaches
Southeast Missouri State Redhawks football coaches
Stanford Cardinal football coaches
UNLV Rebels football coaches
Western Michigan Broncos football coaches
Trinidad and Tobago emigrants to the United States
Trinidad and Tobago players of American football